Khawaja Muhammad Zaman of Luari (1713 - 1775 AD : 1125 - 1188 AH) was a sufi saint and poet from Sindh.  His father, Shaikh Abdul Latif Siddiqi, was a descendant of first Rashidun Caliph Abu Bakr. Their forefathers had moved to Sindh in Abbasid era.

Biography 
Shaikh Abdul Latif was a follower of the Naqshbandi Sufi sect so Muhammad Zaman learned Quran and Sufi teachings from his father. Then he was sent to Thatta to study further in the Madrassa of Shaikh Muhammad Sadiq Naqshbandi who was a follower of Shah Abdul Latif Bhittai. During this time he met Khawaja Abul Masakin, who was a Sufi saint and a follower of the Sirhandi saints, and left the madrassa of Muhammad Sadiq Naqshbandi to start Sufi training under Abul Masakin from whom he later earned the title of Sultan Al Aoliya (Master of Sufis). After some time Abul Masakin appointed him his successor and himself went to Mecca for Hajj  where he died shortly afterward. Muhammad Zaman then started  preaching sufism, training people in the path of divine love. By this time he was a complete Sheikh. Later, Muhammad Zaman moved to his home town Luari and continued his preachings, where he attracted masses of people around him.

Shah Abdul Latif Bhittai, a Sufi poet himself, once came to Luari to meet Muhammad Zaman. After the meeting Latif is said to have repeatedly recited this verse in praise of Muhammad Zaman:

He died on January 6, 1775 (Dhul-Qadh 4, 1188 AH), and his tomb is in Luari, Sindh.

Poetry 
Muhammad Zaman was also a sufi poet. Though he is said to have said hundreds of poems but only 85 have been available in written form.  A collection of these poems is Abyat Sindhi (Sindhi poems). Faqir Abdul Raheem Garhori, one of his disciples, has written a comprehensive commentary and explanation of these poems, called Sharah Abyat Sindhi. They reflect deep mysteries of sufism and general common sense. Though he was a Naqshbandi and all Naqshbandi sufis follow Wahdat-ash-Shuhūd he seems to have merged Wahdat-ash-Shuhūd and Wahdat-al-Wujūd in his poetry. He says:

This implies that claim of Mansoor Ana-al-Haqq (I am God: Haqq is a name of God in Islam) was not pointless as he had discovered the fact that his existence and that of the universe was nothing but the manifestation of God's attributes, as the yarn is nothing but cotton, therefore Mansoor should not be killed. At some other point he says in favour of Shuhūd:

Thus, while the universe does not have its own existence, it is not the same as God. But generally, it is considered that he was neither on side of Wahdat-al-Shuhūd completely nor in complete favour of Wahdat-al-Wujūd, instead he combined both ideologies to show that the differences in between them were mere of words and not real.

References

External links 

 Sindh Government, Auqaf Department http://www.sindh.gov.pk/dpt/usharzakaat/khwajazaman.htm
 Abyat Sindhi https://archive.org/details/SharahAbyatSindhi
 Nukaat-us-soofiya https://archive.org/details/Nukaat-us-soofiya-ArabicCommentaryOnSindhiSufiPoetryarabic 
 http://www.aulia-e-hind.com/dargah/Intl/pakistan.htm#8

Sindhi Sufis
Sufism
Sindhi People
Sufi poets
Sufis of Sindh
Sindhi-language poets
1713 births
1775 deaths